Elektrozorn Vol. 1 is a 2014 promo Industrial/EBM compilation album of exclusive and never-released before music by various artists special for Russian subcultural "Bunker" magazine.

Track listing

See also
 Industrial music
 Electronic body music

References

External links
 Elektrozorn Vol. 1  at Discogs

2014 compilation albums